Mavi is a Turkish brand of denim and jeans-wear founded in 1991, based in Istanbul, Turkey. The company manufactures jeans for both women and men, targeting a younger age group. The global operation is headquartered in Turkey, with subsidiaries in the USA, Canada, Germany, Netherlands, Russia and Australia.

Mavi has flagship stores in New York City, Vancouver,  Istanbul, Berlin, Frankfurt, Düsseldorf, Hamburg and Moscow.

Celebrities who wear this brand of jeans include Kate Winslet and Chelsea Clinton. In 2012, Adriana Lima signed a contract with Mavi for a marketing campaign, recording a series of commercials. The campaign was so successful, that the sales increased 50%.

The word 'Mavi' in company's name, is a Turkish language word which mean "blue". The major factory of company is located in Çerkezköy, Tekirdağ Province.

References

External links
 

Clothing brands
Jeans by brand
Clothing companies of Turkey
Companies based in Istanbul
Clothing companies established in 1991
Turkish companies established in 1991
Turkish brands
Clothing brands of Turkey
Companies listed on the Istanbul Stock Exchange